MontFort Inter College formerly called the Mahanagar Boys' Inter College is an educational institution established in July 1959 by the Society of St.Grabiel in Lucknow, India affiliated to the Central Board of Secondary Education.

In 2008 the name was changed to "Montfort Inter College" due to the coming of  girl students to the school.

The school runs classes from L.K.G (Lower Kindergarten) to class XII and prepares students for the Board Examinations of the Central Board of Secondary Education. The principal is  Jinu Abraham . In the 2015 session, girls started in the secondary wing as the school became affiliated to the Central Board of Secondary Education.

History
The college is situated in the residential colony of Mahanagar, near Gol Market, in the trans-Gomti area of Lucknow, the capital of Uttar Pradesh.

The land of Montfort and of Mahanagar Boys' Inter College was taken possession of by the Catholic Diocese of Lucknow in 1957, its boundaries marked in 1962 and registration done in 1964. The foundation stone of the building was laid by the Bishop of Lucknow.

Principal Bro. Joachim joined the school on 15 June 1959. The complete ground floors of the three units were completed by 10 July 1959 and were dedicated by the Bishop on 14 July 1959. The school opened on 15 July 1959 with forty students on the rolls in classes III, IV, and V of English language and class VI of Hindi language. There were six teachers on the rolls, of whom three were Brothers - Joachim, Ignatius, and Patrick.

The institution was listed as a Recognized Junior High School in November 1962. The primary section was accorded recognition with effect from January 1963.

The school was permitted to start classes for standard IX and above in 1963. The high school (standard IX and X) section was given recognition in 1965. Permission was sought to teach using the English language in addition to Hindi. The permission came on in 1963. Intermediate classes (standard XI and XII) were introduced in July 1984 and recognition was obtained in September 1984.

To cater to the needs of a primary section, Montfort Primary school was started in 1982 in a separate building. The institution became a fully-fledged primary school from Lower Kindergarten to Class V by 1994. Montfort School has two shifts, the first shift is for classes II to V and the second shift is for LKG to Class I. The new building for the primary wing was inaugurated at the occasion of the Golden Jubilee Ceremony of the institution. This facilitated the conduction of classes for all students in the morning shift.

Facilities

Library
The school has a well-equipped library with over 10,000 books divided into various sections like literature, science, mathematics, social sciences, philosophy, religion, and reference books for competitions apart from leading newspapers, magazines, and periodicals.

Regular Library periods are allotted in which students are encouraged to cultivate reading habits.

National Cadet Corp
The school enrolls students in the three wings of the National Cadet Corps- Army wing (Senior), Naval wing (Junior), Air wing (Junior).

There are approximately 150 cadets in each of the wings headed by experienced A.N.Os.

Interdistrict camps for a minimum of 10 days are held and students are prepared for the 'A' and 'B' Certificates.
Parades are held on every Friday and Saturday for regular updates of cadets.

Scouting
The school also provides the facility of Scouting/Guiding for the student of classes III to VIII.

Two Troops of Scouts are registered with Uttar Pradesh Bharat Scouts and Guides and there are about 250 Scouts enrolled from Pravesh level to Rashtrapati Award Level. Various activities like regular Parades, Classes, and Camps are organized for them.

They participate and excel in Montfortian Scout Camps, National Integration Camps, and various other Environment and Literacy Projects.

Extension Service (National Institute of Open Schooling)
The school is an Accredited Institution of the National Institute of Open Schooling. Students who do not complete their secondary and senior secondary courses in the formal system enroll themselves in the National Institute of Open Schooling which is under H.R.D. Ministry. Between 250 and 400 students enroll themselves at the center every year.

The school is also one of the centers for conducting the National Institute of Open Schooling Board Examinations.

References

External links
Official website

Boys' schools in India
Catholic schools in India
Primary schools in Uttar Pradesh
High schools and secondary schools in Uttar Pradesh
Intermediate colleges in Uttar Pradesh
Christian schools in Uttar Pradesh
Private schools in Lucknow
Educational institutions established in 1959
1959 establishments in Uttar Pradesh